Bhadravati (formerly Bhandak) is a city and a municipal council in Chandrapur district  in the state of Maharashtra, India. It lies 26 km from Chandrapur city. 
Bhadravati city has recently bagged the Best City in 'Innovation & Best Practices' award under the population Category - 50K to 1 Lakh from the Government of India under Swach Surverkshan Awards-2021. 
It has also bagged 8th Rank in being the cleanest city under category population Category - 50K to 1 Lakh under Swach Surverkshan Awards-2021 amongst 132 cities nominated. 

It has an ordnance factory and several open-cast coal mines.

History

Gavrala, a small hamlet near Bhadravati, has been excavated by the Department of Ancient Indian History, Culture and Archeology, Nagpur during 2006–07. They have unearthed fortifications of the Vakataka period.

Historic places

Bhadrawati Fort
The Bhadrawati Fort is located In heart of Bhadrawati City. This historical monument was made by the Gond king Bhankyasing across 3 acres of land. There is a big gate to the front of the fort, and all four sides are surrounded by huge walls. There is also a deep ancient well at the center of the fort. The locals say that the fort developed over 2000 years ago. Outside of the forth there are a few houses in which local residents live. Some structural stones are present in near area.

Bhadranag Mandir
The city has an ancient temple of Bhadranag a form of Lord Shiva, popularly known as Nagoba Mandir or Nag Mandir. It is visited by a large number of devotees on Mahashivratri and Nag-Panchami. This temple gives the city its name of Bhadravati.

Jain Mandir
There is Jain temple dedicated to 23rd Jain Tirthankar Parshvanath known as Kesariyaji Parshvanath  located in Bhadravati. The temple belongs to Shwetamber sect of Jain religion.

Ganesh Temple
There is also a Ganesh temple at Gavrala and its architecture and archaeological remains refers the art of the late ancient historic period.

Vijasan Tekdi
There are 2000 years old Buddhist caves in Vijasan Tekdi at Vijasan village. These caves have hosted International Buddha Dhamma conventions. Several leaders and Monks of Buddha Dhamma from all over the world have represented at the convention.

Bhawani Mata Mandir
Bhawani Mata Mandir Is an ancient temple Located near Bhadranag Temple. this temple is Underground Temple in Special vocation Navratra And Astami This Place is Full Of Crowd.

Mahishasur Mardini Mandir
An Ancient temple Located On Vijasan Tekdi deoolwada road Bhadrawati This Place was huge Gathering in Navaratri.

Chandika Mata Mandir
This Ancient temple Is located behind Jain Temple. There are ancient structures around the Temple.

Religious places

Temples

 Sai Mandir, Bagade Wadi
 Vithhal Rukmai Mandir, Vithhal Mandir Ward
 Old Bhairawa Shiva Temple, Bengali Camp Road
 Remains Of Old Temple, Near Bagade Wadi
 Durga Mandir, Bengali Camp
 Videhi Sadguru Jagannath Maharaj Math, Vijasan
 Datta Mandir, Sane Guruji Society
 Shiva Temple, Malhari Baba Society, Sumthana
 Balaji Temple, O.F Chanda - Sumthana Road
 Remains Of Medieval Temple, Dollara Talav
 Zinguji Maharaj Math, Zinguji Ward
 Gajanan Maharaj Mandir, Suraksha Nagar

Mosques
 Khwaja Garib Nawaz Masjid, Bhojward
 Jama Masjid, Bazar Ward
 Madina Masjid, Shahi Square
 Defence Mosque, O.F Chanda - Sumthana Road
 Hanfiya Masjid, Dollara Talav
 Noorani Masjid, Gaurala
 Mosque, Santaji Nagar

Gurudwaras
 Gurudwara Gurunanak Sahib, Dollara
 Gurudwara, O.F Chanda - Sumthana Road

Churches
 St. Thomas Church, Gandhi Square
 The Pentecostal Mission Church, Thenge Plot, Chichordi
 O.F Chanda Church, O.F Chanda - Sumthana Road
 Christian Church, Dollara Talav
Jesus Evangelical Church,Guru nagar Near Murmura Karkhana

Economy

Major Employers
 Ordnance Factory
 Western Coalfields Limited
 Karnataka EMTA
 Open Cast Coal Mines

Bhadravati is surrounded by open cast coal mines. There are mines at Majri, Chargaon, New Kunada, Telvasa, Dhorwasa, Baranj.

Bhadrawati Market
Bhadravati also has a market place (composed of grain and grocery stores, cloths and general shops, households appliances, specialized hospitals, medical stores, good hotels, etc.) serving the localities and nearby villages.

Transport

Bus

The city is served by a MSRTC bus stand on NH-930, or the Nagpur-Chandrapur Highway. Buses run to various destinations like Aurangabad, Mancherial, Nagpur, Pune, Wardha, Gondia, Yeotmal, Ambejogai, and Shirdi. There are also private buses to Nagpur, Chandrapur, Chimur,  and Pune other destinations.

Railway
Bhadrawati Railway Station is Regular Type Railway Station. The Name Of Bhadrawati Railway Station is Bhandak Railway Station. Is Situated at 4 km South at Gaurala From MSRTC Bus Stop.
This Railway Station Situated At Delhi-Chennai Route Under Central Railway Nagpur Region.
There are few stoppages of train here.

Road
At As the city is located on MH MSH 264 or NH-930 it has good transport facility. Bhadrawati Also Connected To Bhadrawati-Chandankheda-Shegaon Road, Bhadrawati-Konda-Majri-Wani Road

Local Transport

Auto rickshaws are the only public transport in the city.
Black And Yellow Taxies And Rikshaws Also Available for Chandrapur, Lonara, Ghodpeth, Tadali, Padoli, Dhorwasa, Telwasa, Chandankheda, Baranj, Konda & Majari etc.

Other Transport
Bhadrawati is connected with major cities like Chandrapur, Nagpur, Pune, Aurangabad, Adilabad, Akola, Amravati, Yeotmal, Pusad, Asifabad, Hyderabad Raipur, Washim, Gadchiroli, Darwha, Digras, Ner etc... by MSRTC buses, Private Transport System & CR Railway.

Education

Bhadravati has below education facilities.

Schools and Colleges
 Dr. Ambedkar Memorial High School
 N.S. College of Science.
 Fairyland school
 Vivekanand College
 New Vivekanand Kanya Vidyalaya.
 Z.P. High School
 Lokmanya Tilak Maha Vidyalaya
 St Anne's High School
 Ordnance Factory High School
 K.V.O.F. Chanda
 Karmavir Vidyalaya
 Takshshila College
 Y.S. Jr. College
 Macaroon Student's Academy

Primary Schools
 Eurolittles Pre School
 Twinkling Stars Kindergarten
 Bhadrawati Public School
 Dnyaandeep English Medium School
 Shri Sai Convent
 Ankur Vidya Mandir
 Dafodil Convent
 Yashwantrao shinde primary school

Industrial Training & Engineering College
 Shri Sai College of Engineering and Technology
 Govt. Industrial Training Institute
 Shri Sai Industrial Training Institute
 Nilkanthrao Shinde Pvt. Industrial Training Institute
 Priyadarshini Industrial Training Institute
 Kutemate Industrial Training Institute

Demographics
Bhadravati is a Municipal Council city in district of Chandrapur, Maharashtra. The Bhadravati city is divided into 26 wards for which elections are held every 5 years. The Bhadravati Municipal Council has population of 40,565 of which 21,451 are males while 19,114 are females as per report released by census of India 2011,

Population of children with age of 0-6 is 6211 which is 10.26% of total population of Bhadravati. Female Sex Ratio is of 926 against state average of 929. Child sex ratio in Bhadravati is around 954 compared to Maharashtra state average of 894. Literacy rate of Bhadravati city is 89.26%, higher than state average of 82.34%. Male literacy is 93.02% while female literacy rate is 85.19%.

Bhadravati Municipal Council has over 14,617 houses to which it supplies basic amenities like water and sewerage. It is also authorized to build roads within municipal council limits and impose taxes on properties under its jurisdiction.

References

 Jain Temple Bhadrawati

Cities and towns in Chandrapur district
Talukas in Maharashtra
Vidarbha
Historical places Vidarbha